Dewayne Petty (born 1973), known professionally as Pettidee, is a record producer, actor and Christian rap artist from Tallahassee, Florida. Pettidee has been nominated for a Grammy and Stella Award for producing for groups such as group Grits and I-Rocc.

Early life
Dewayne Petty was born in Tallahassee, Florida. As a child, Pettidee grew up in a dysfunctional family and became a street hustler as well as a drug user by the age of nine. After being on the streets Pettidee accepted Jesus Christ into his life and began seeking after God's will. Pettidee is best known for producing beats for the group Grits. Pettidee also has achieved Billboard Gospel Album success. Resurrections: Past, Present And Future reached 48 and Thug Love reached 31 on the Billboard Gospel Billboard.

Discography
Studio albums

 Still Alive (1999)
 The Legacy - Volume 1 (2001)
 Street Music: The Legacy - Volume 2 (2002)
 Thug Love (2006)
 The Greatest Stories Ever Told (2007)
 Resurrections: Past, Present and Future (2007)
 Pettidee Presents: A Soldier Sound Christmas (2008)
 Race 2 Nowhere (2009)
 Kill the Messengers Mixtape (2013)
 Alien (2019)

References

External links 

1973 births
Living people
Musicians from Tallahassee, Florida
Rappers from Florida
American performers of Christian music
Performers of Christian hip hop music
21st-century American rappers